Gualtieri Sicaminò is a comune (municipality) in the Metropolitan City of Messina in the Italian region Sicily, located about  east of Palermo and about  west of Messina.

Gualtieri Sicaminò borders the following municipalities: Condrò, Pace del Mela, San Pier Niceto, Santa Lucia del Mela.
   

Cities and towns in Sicily